Chantal Conand (born 10 April 1943) is a French marine biologist.

Biography 
Conand obtained her PhD in biological oceanography at University of Western Brittany in Brest in 1988. Her thesis focused on Aspidochirotida of the New Caledonia Barrier Reef. In January 1993, she joined the marine ecology laboratory (ECOMAR) at the University of La Réunion and eventually became its chief scientist. Her expertise extends to all echinoderms of the Indo-Pacific, but her work has focused on sea cucumbers, but also on other echinoderms of la Réunion. Her other work has included studies of the crown-of-thorns starfish, which preys upon hard, or stony, coral polyps (Scleractinia). She was a member of the scientific committee of the Western Indian Ocean Marine Science Association from 2001 to 2004. She has since retired and become emeritus faculty.

Works 
Her works include more than thirty books or book chapters and over 100 peer-reviewed articles and reports.

Books 
 
 
 
 
 
 .

Papers 
 
 .
 
 .
 .
 .

Honour 
Two species of Starfishes are dedicated to her: Aquilonastra conandae et Aquilonastra chantalae.

Notes & references

External links 
 

French marine biologists
1943 births
Living people
University of Western Brittany alumni